LWB may refer to:

 Greenbrier Valley Airport (IATA code: LWB), near Lewisburg, West Virginia
Libraries without Borders (Bibliothèques Sans Frontières), a French-based educational non-profit
 Life without Barriers, part of the Australian Council of Social Service
 Longwing Blucher (aka Longwing Brogue), see Brogue shoe
 Long-Wheel-Base, see wheelbase
 Labor and Welfare Bureau, a bureau of the government of HKSAR
 Long Win Bus, a bus company in Hong Kong
 Wide-body aircraft or Large Wide Body Aircraft
 Left wing-back, a position in association football